Mothxr (stylized as MOTHXR) is a four-piece indie pop band from Brooklyn, New York. They are led by Penn Badgley, of Gossip Girl and You fame.

History
Producer Jimmy Giannopoulos (Lolawolf, Reputante) and vocalist Penn Badgley, neighborhood friends for years in New York, waited patiently for a sound to manifest beyond their bond based upon an odd pop aesthetic. Bassist Darren Will (Rathborne) was always orbiting, always an obvious partner when the time came. The three finally decided to hole up in a little bungalow in East LA to record for eight days without anything written, without expectation. Seeking a microphone, they found in the neighborhood one-time-Brooklynite and New Zealand expat Simon Oscroft (No), who proved to be the guitarist they weren't looking for. The spontaneous quartet recorded five songs in five days before taking a breath to see they had, in fact, started a band.

In early 2014, they released a song titled "Easy" on SoundCloud under the name M O T H E R; the song quickly gained popularity and was posted on numerous blogs. Months later, the band changed the spelling of their name to MOTHXR, citing a cease-and-desist from another band with a similar name. In 2015, the band signed with the labels Kitsuné and Washington Square Music, the New York City-based subdivision of the Razor & Tie label. MOTHXR has supported acts such as Streets of Laredo, San Cisco, Sir Sly, Har Mar Superstar, The Neighbourhood, and Miami Horror. Their debut album, Centerfold, was released on February 26, 2016.

Band members
 Penn Badgley – vocals, keyboards
 Darren Will – bass guitar
 Simon Oscroft – guitar
 Jimmy Giannopoulos – production, drum programming

Discography
Studio albums
 Centerfold (2016)

Singles
 "Easy" (2014)
 "Touch" (2015)
 "Victim" (2015)
 "She Can't Tell" (2015)
 "Wild ride" (2015)
 "Stranger" (2015)
 "Underground" (2015)
 "Impossible" (2015)

References

Musical groups from New York City
Indie pop groups from New York (state)
American musical groups
Musical quartets
Razor & Tie artists
Musical groups established in 2013
2013 establishments in New York City